Twilight is the time of day before sunrise or after sunset.

Twilight may also refer to:

Arts, entertainment and media

Fictional characters
 Twilight (Marvel Comics), in the Marvel Comics X-Nation 2099 series
 Twilight, in the DP 7 comic book series
 Twilight, a persona of Angel (Buffy the Vampire Slayer)
 Twilight, in the Milestone Comics superhero team Shadow Cabinet
 Twilight, a great grey owl in the Guardians of Ga'Hoole novel series by Kathryn Lasky
 Twilight, from Go! Princess Precure
 Twilight Sparkle, from My Little Pony: Friendship Is Magic
 Sophie Twilight, from Ms. Vampire Who Lives in My Neighborhood
 Twilight, the main character of the manga series Spy × Family

Film 
 Twilight (1940 film), a German film by Rudolf van der Noss
 Twilight (1944 film), a French drama film directed by Marc Allégret
 Twilight (1945 film), a Mexican drama film directed by Julio Bracho 
 Twilight (1969 film), a Cambodian film by King Norodom Sihanouk
 Twilight (1998 film), an American thriller by Robert Benton
 Twilight (2007 film), a.k.a. La Brunante, a Canadian drama film directed by Fernand Dansereau
 The Twilight Saga (film series), adapted from Stephenie Meyer's novels
 Twilight (2008 film), the first film in the series
 Twilight (2014 film), a film by Valentyn Vasyanovych ranked as one of the 100 best films in Ukrainian cinema

Television
 "Twilight" (NCIS), 2005
 "Twilight" (Star Trek: Enterprise), 2003
 "Twilight", a 1989 episode of China Beach
 "Twilight", a 2008 episode of Di-Gata Defenders
 "Twilight", a 2003 episode of The Galaxy Railways
 "Twilight", a 1998 episode of Hercules: The Legendary Journeys
 "Twilight", a 1998 episode of Lexx
 "Twilight", a 2006 episode of Rescue Me
 "Twilight", a 2003 episode of Six Feet Under
 "Twilight", a 2003 episode of Justice League

Books 
 Twilight (novel series), by Stephenie Meyer
 Twilight (Meyer novel), the first novel in the series
 "Twilight" (Campbell short story), by John W. Campbell, 1934
 Twilight (Cabot novel), in the Mediator series by Meg Cabot, 2004
 Twilight (Hunter novel), a 2007 Warriors: The New Prophecy novel by Erin Hunter
 Twilight (Wiesel novel), by Elie Wiesel, 1988
 Twilight: Where Darkness Begins, a 1980s series of teen horror novels
 Twilight, a novel by Brendan DuBois
 Twilight, a novel by Yosef Reinman, published under the pen name Avner Gold
 Twilight, a novella by Stefan Zweig, 1910

Comics 

 Twilight X, by Joseph Wight
 Twilight (Avatar Press), a Bad Girl comic from Avatar Press 
 Twilight (comic book), a 1990 DC Comics miniseries by Howard Chaykin and Jose Luis Garcia Lopez
 Twilight (Buffy comic), a story arc of the series Buffy the Vampire Slayer Season Eight
 Twilight, a story arc of the Star Wars: Republic comic book series
 Twilight: The Graphic Novel, a 2-part comic book miniseries by Young Kim

Music

Classical
 "Twilight" (Elgar), by Edward Elgar, based on the Gilbert Parker poem

Bands
 Twilight (band), an American metal band
 Beyond Twilight, originally Twilight, a Danish progressive metal band 
 Deathbound, originally Twilight, a Finnish death metal band

Albums 
 Twilight (Blue System album), 1989
 Twilight (Bôa album) or the title song, 2001
 Twilight (Erben der Schöpfung album), 2001
 Twilight (Future of Forestry album) or the title song, 2007
 Twilight (Hale album), 2006
 Twilight (The Handsome Family album), 2001
 Twilight (The Suicide File album) or the title song, 2003
 Twilight (Twilight album), 2005
 Twilight (soundtrack), from the 2008 film 
 Twilight as Played by The Twilight Singers or the title song, 2000
 Twilight, by Caroline Herring, 2001
 Twilight, by Corpus Delicti, 1993
 Twilight, a demo album by Leona Lewis

Songs 
 "Twilight" (Cover Drive song), 2012
 "Twilight" (Electric Light Orchestra song), 1981
 "Twilight", by BZN, 1982
 "Twilight", by Antony and the Johnsons from Antony and the Johnsons, 2000
 "Twilight", by the Band from The Best of The Band, 1976
 "Twilight", by Bravehearts from Bravehearted, 2003
 "Twilight", by Delerium from Karma, 1997
 "Twilight", by Edge of Sanity from Purgatory Afterglow, 1994
 "Twilight", by Elliott Smith from From a Basement on the Hill, 2004
 "Twilight", by Fear, and Loathing in Las Vegas from Dance & Scream, 2010
 "Twilight", by God Is an Astronaut from The End of the Beginning, 2002
 "Twilight", by Loona from Kim Lip, 2017
 "Twilight", by Maze from Back to Basics, 1993
 "Twilight", by the Raveonettes from Pretty in Black, 2005
 "Twilight", by Safri Duo, 2008
 "Twilight", by Squirrel Nut Zippers from Hot, 1996
 "Twilight", by Thriving Ivory from Thriving Ivory, 2008
 "Twilight", by U2 from Boy, 1980
 "Twilight", by Unkle from War Stories, 2007
 "Twilight", by Vanessa Carlton from Be Not Nobody, 2002

Visual arts
 Twilight (painting), a 1981 painting by Odd Nerdrum
 Twilight, a series of photographs by Gregory Crewdson

Other uses in arts and entertainment
 Twilight (game developer), a defunct UK video game development group
 Twilight: 2000, a 1984 role-playing game
 Twilight: Los Angeles, 1992, a 1994 play by Anna Deavere Smith
 Project: Twilight, a 2001 audio drama based on the TV series Doctor Who

People
 Alexander Twilight (1795–1857), Vermont politician

Places
 Twilight, Pennsylvania, U.S.
 Twilight, West Virginia, U.S.
 Twilight, Ohio County, West Virginia, U.S.
 Twilight Bay, Antarctica
 Twilight Peak, a mountain in Colorado, U.S.

Other uses
 Twilight (1864 towboat)
 Twilight (warez), a former monthly Dutch warez disc compilation series
 Twilight anesthesia, an anesthetic technique
 Twilight Festival, in Columbia, Missouri, U.S.
 Twilight Criterium, a bicycle racing event in Athens, Georgia, U.S.

See also
 
 
 Twilight zone (disambiguation)
 Yugure (disambiguation)